List of historic buildings in Ho Chi Minh City:

Buildings in Ho Chi Minh city have a variety of foreign influences, notably from China and France, two countries that once ruled over Vietnam.

18th century

19th century

1900-1909

1910s

1920s

1930s

1940s

Historic buildings

Historic
Buildings